Harnam Singh Rawail (21 August 1921 – 17 September 2004), often credited as H. S. Rawail, was an Indian filmmaker. He debuted as a director with the 1940 Bollywood film Dorangia Daku and is best known for romantic films like Mere Mehboob (1963), Sunghursh (1968), Mehboob Ki Mehndi (1971) and Laila Majnu (1976). His son Rahul Rawail and grandson Rajat Rawail (through daughter Roshni Rawail) are film directors too; the former paid a tribute to his father's film Sunghursh by titling one of his film as Jeevan Ek Sanghursh (1990).

Personal life and career 

Rawail was born in Lyallpur, Punjab, British India and moved to Mumbai to aspire to be a filmmaker. Later, he moved to Kolkata where he wrote several film scripts and debuted as a director with Dorangia Daku (1940). His three consecutive films; Shukriya (1944), Zid (1945) and Jhoothi Kasmein (1948); were commercial failures. His next film Patanga (1949) was successful and was the seventh highest grossing Bollywood film of 1949. The film is still remembered for the song "Mere Piya Gaye Rangoon" performed by Shamshad Begum.

Later, Rawail's nine consecutive films from 1949 till 1956 did not perform well on the box office. In March 1956, Rawail started with two new projects, Chaalbaaz with Meena Kumari and Baazigar with Vyjayanthimala. Both the films were dropped eventually. However, in 1958 director Nanabhai Bhatt revived both the project starring Nirupa Roy. Rawail took three years sabbatical and returned in 1959 with a comedy film Shararat, starring Raaj Kumar, Kishore Kumar and Meena Kumari. The film was not a commercial success along with his next two films, Roop Ki Rani Choron Ka Raja (1961), starring Dev Anand and Waheeda Rehman and Kanch Ki Gudiya (1963) starring Manoj Kumar. But the film brought recognition to Manoj Kumar after having starred in various unsuccessful films before.

Rawail's major success came with 1963 musical film Mere Mehboob starring Rajendra Kumar and Sadhana Shivdasani. Kumar had earlier worked as an assistant director to Rawail. The film was praised for Rawail's direction and is remembered for title song composed by music director Naushad and performed by singers Mohammed Rafi and Lata Mangeshkar. His next film Sunghursh (1968) was based on a novel written by the Bengali author Mahashweta Devi. The film was set in 19th century and showcased the lives of bandits. It was praised for the "exceptional performances" by its actors like Dilip Kumar, Vyjayanthimala, Balraj Sahni, Sanjeev Kumar and Jayant. The actor-director Rakesh Roshan had worked as an assistant director on the film.

His next film Mehboob Ki Mehndi (1971), featuring Rajesh Khanna and Leena Chandavarkar performed well at the box office and is counted among the 17 consecutive hits of Khanna and was recognised for its music composed by Laxmikant–Pyarelal. Later his 1976 film Laila Majnu, starring Rishi Kapoor and Ranjeeta Kaur in lead roles, became a success. Rawail's last film as director Deedar-E-Yaar (1982) was a commercial failure with which he took sabbatical from the film industry.

His son Rahul Rawail is also a film director and is best known for films like Love Story (1981), Betaab (1983), Arjun (1985) and Anjaam (1994). He paid a tribute to his father's "best work" Sunghursh (1968) by titling one of his film as Jeevan Ek Sanghursh (1990). Rawail's grandson Bharat Rawail is an upcoming director, who recently assisted Yash Chopra for his last film, Jab Tak Hai Jaan (2012). Rawail died on 17 September 2004 at the age of 83 in Mumbai.

Filmography

Awards 

 National Film Awards

 1963 – 11th National Film Awards – Certificate of Merit for the Second Best Feature Film – Mere Mehboob as both producer and director.

 Bengal Film Journalists' Association Awards

 1968 – 32nd Annual BFJA Awards – Fourth Best Indian Film – Sunghursh

References

External links 
 

1921 births
2004 deaths
Film directors from Mumbai
Indian male screenwriters
Punjabi people
People from Bandra
Hindi-language film directors
20th-century Indian film directors
20th-century Indian screenwriters
20th-century Indian male writers